The ashy roundleaf bat (Hipposideros cineraceus) is a species of bat in the family Hipposideridae  found in Bhutan, Cambodia, India, Indonesia, Laos, Malaysia, Myanmar, Nepal,  Pakistan, Thailand, and Vietnam.

Taxonomy and etymology
It was described as a new species in 1853 by English zoologist Edward Blyth. The holotype had been collected by William Theobald near the Salt Range in Bhera, Pakistan. Its species name "cineraceus" is derived from Latin "cinereus," meaning "ashen." Blyth described parts of its fur as "greyish-white."

Description
It is a small species of bat, with individuals weighing . It has a simple nose-leaf with a raised bump on the nasal septum.

Biology and ecology
It roosts in sheltered places such as caves during the day.

Range and habitat
Its range includes several countries in South and Southeast Asia. It has been documented in Cambodia, India, Indonesia, Laos, Malaysia, Myanmar, Pakistan, Thailand, and Vietnam.

Conservation
As of 2019, it is assessed as a least-concern species by the IUCN.

References

Hipposideros
Bats of South Asia
Bats of Southeast Asia
Bats of India
Bats of Indonesia
Bats of Malaysia
Mammals of Borneo
Mammals of Myanmar
Mammals of Cambodia
Mammals of Laos
Mammals of Nepal
Mammals of the Philippines
Mammals of Thailand
Mammals of Vietnam
Mammals of Pakistan
Mammals described in 1853
Taxonomy articles created by Polbot
Taxa named by Edward Blyth